The Columbia, Newberry and Laurens Railroad  was a  railroad line between Columbia and Laurens.

In 1885, the South Carolina General Assembly issued a charter for the Columbia, Newberry and Laurens Railroad, and the line was officially christened on Christmas Day 1885. In 1896, the Laurens Railroad was purchased from the Richmond & Danville Railroad to complete the line to Laurens.

The first locomotive of the CN&L was built in 1887 and sold in 1922. The CN&L ran daily passenger trains from Union Station in Columbia to Laurens, always pulled by steam until the early 1930s, when it switched to its own station in Columbia at 630 Gervais Street. Passenger service was discontinued in 1952.

The railroad saw to the creation of towns along its line. Towns such as Irmo, Chapin, Little Mountain, Prosperity and Joanna owe their existence in part to their locations along the CN&L.

In 1924 the Atlantic Coast Line Railroad acquired control of the line. It became part of the CSX Transportation system in 1984.

See also
CN&L Subdivision

References

Further reading

Defunct South Carolina railroads
Predecessors of the Atlantic Coast Line Railroad
Railway companies established in 1886
Railway companies disestablished in 1986